Kevon Clement (born October 23, 1983 in Trinidad) is a Trinidad and Tobago football player, who plays as a midfielder for United Petrotrin (TT Pro League).

International career
He is also current member of the U-23 team from Soca Warriors.

References

External links
 Player Profile on Petrotrin.com
 

TT Pro League players
Living people
1983 births
Trinidad and Tobago footballers
Association football midfielders
Trinidad and Tobago international footballers